Sorbinichthys is an extinct genus of clupeomorph bony fish from the Cenomanian of Lebanon and Morocco.

Classification
Sorbinichthys was described for the first time in 2000 by Bannikov and Bacchia and, on the basis of specimens found in Lebanon, in the En Nammoura. These specimens were designated as S. elusivo, the type species, was placed in a newly erected family Sorbinichthyidae. Similar fossils from Morocco were described as the species S. africanus, in 2011 .

Sorbinichthys belongs to the Ellimmichthyiformes, a group of bony fish closely related to herring and sardines, that lived from the Cretaceous until the Eocene.

Description
The genus contains two species, S. elusivo (found in Lebanon) and S. africanus (from Morocco). The Lebanese species could reach a length of over 15 cm, while S. africanus was smaller and reaching a length of about 5 cm. Sorbinichthys had a body high and narrow, and was equipped with a tip radius of the second dorsal very long (longer in S. elusivo than in S. africanus).

The scales were diamond-shaped, and along the dorsal edge of the back were diamond-shaped scutes. The dorsal, caudal, pelvic and pectoral fins either had, or, in the case of the pectoral fins, were modified into long filaments. These filaments were visible in the original fossils only until after preparation was completed, hence the specific epithet elusivo ("hidden"), referring to how the long, delicate filaments were not discovered until afterwards.

References

External links
 Paleontology Taxa

Prehistoric ray-finned fish genera
Clupeiformes
Cretaceous bony fish
Late Cretaceous fish
Fossil taxa described in 2000
Prehistoric fish of Asia
Prehistoric fish of Africa